Kalnik may refer to:

 Kalnik, North Macedonia, a village in Bogovinje Municipality, Macedonia
 Kalnik (mountain), a mountain in Croatia
 Kalnik, Koprivnica-Križevci County, a municipality in Croatia
 Dolný Kalník, a village in Slovakia
 Horný Kalník, a village in Slovakia
 Kalnik (river), a river in Bulgaria, tributary of Vit
 Kalnik, an alternative name for Kuzmyno, a village in Ukraine
 Kalnik, an evil alien character in Mork & Mindy who claims to be from Neptune